Keezhppally is a town in the Aralam panchayat of the Kannur district in Kerala, India.

Location
Keezhppally is located 14 km from Iritty. The Aralam Wildlife Sanctuary is located nearby.

Tourism
The main pilgrim centers are Saint Chavara Kuriakose Elias Church-Keezhpally, Assemblies of God church (Pentecostal church) Puthiyangadi, Keezhpally MQAM Shareef - Puthyngadi, Keezhpaly Juma Masjid, Palarinjal Sree Mahadeve Temple (web site http://www.palarinjaltemple.com)and Palarinjal Bhagavathy Temple.   aralam farm and aralam wild life sanctuary is very near to Keezhpally

Transportation
The national highway passes through Kannur town.  Mangalore and Mumbai can be accessed on the northern side and Cochin and Thiruvananthapuram can be accessed on the southern side.  The road to the east of Iritty connects to Mysore and Bangalore.   The nearest railway station is Thalassery on Mangalore-Palakkad line. There are airports at Mangalore and Calicut.

Notable people
 Abin Joseph: Malayalam language short story writer

References 

Villages near Iritty